Jocelyn Jean-Marc Lemieux (born November 18, 1967) is a Canadian former professional ice hockey player who played 597 games in the National Hockey League with six teams over thirteen seasons before finishing his career with the Long Beach Ice Dogs of the IHL.

He now works as an analyst for Le Hockey des Sénateurs on RDS.

Awards and accomplishments
1985-86, QMJHL First All-Star Team

Career statistics

Personal
Jocelyn is the brother of four-time Stanley Cup champion Claude Lemieux, who played twenty seasons in the National Hockey League and the uncle of Brendan Lemieux, who is a member of the NHL's Los Angeles Kings.

External links

1967 births
Calgary Flames players
Canadian people of French descent
Chicago Blackhawks players
Hartford Whalers players
Ice hockey people from Quebec
Laval Titan players
Laval Voisins players
Living people
Long Beach Ice Dogs (IHL) players
Montreal Canadiens players
National Hockey League first-round draft picks
New Jersey Devils players
People from Mont-Laurier
Phoenix Coyotes players
St. Louis Blues draft picks
St. Louis Blues players
Sherbrooke Canadiens players
Canadian ice hockey right wingers